To Party Tis Zois Sou, (in Greek) Το Παρτυ της Ζωης Σου, (Literally: "The Party of Your Life") is a popular Greek television show. Directed by Maria Platanou and hosted by Akis Pavlopoulos, the show features fun dancing and singing.

References
The IMdB Page for the Show
The Official Site for the Show (in Greek)

Greek television series